Conus andamanensis is a species of sea snail, a marine gastropod mollusk in the family Conidae, the cone snails and their allies.

Like all species within the genus Conus, these snails are predatory and venomous. They are capable of "stinging" humans, therefore live ones should be handled carefully or not at all.

Description
The size of the shell varies between 16 mm and 41 mm.

Distribution
This species occurs in the Andaman Sea.

References

 Filmer R.M. (2012) Taxonomic review of the Conus spectrum, Conus stramineus and Conus collisus complexes (Gastropoda - Conidae). Part III: The Conus collisus complex. Visaya 3(6): 4–47.
 Puillandre N., Duda T.F., Meyer C., Olivera B.M. & Bouchet P. (2015). One, four or 100 genera? A new classification of the cone snails. Journal of Molluscan Studies. 81: 1–23

External links
 The Conus Biodiversity website
 Cone Shells – Knights of the Sea
 

andamanensis
Gastropods described in 1879